Fannie Ward (born Fannie Buchanan; February 22, 1872 – January 27, 1952), also credited as Fanny Ward, was an American actress of stage and screen. Known for performing in both comedic and dramatic roles, she was cast in The Cheat, a sexually-charged 1915 silent film directed by Cecil B. DeMille. Reportedly, Ward's ageless appearance helped her to achieve and maintain her celebrity. In its obituary for her, The New York Times describes her as "an actress who never quite reached the top in her profession ... [and who] tirelessly devoted herself to appearing perpetually youthful, an act that made her famous".

Early life and stage career

Born in St. Louis, Missouri, Ward was the only daughter of Eliza and John Buchanan, who was a dry goods merchant. She had one sibling, a brother, Benton.

In 1890, "against the wishes of her parents", Ward made her stage debut as Cupid in Pippino with vaudevillian star Eddie Foy. She soon became a success in 10 stage productions in New York City before sailing in 1894 to London, where she performed in The Shop Girl. Her performances there led critics to compare Ward favorably to actress Maude Adams. In 1898, however, she married a wealthy diamond merchant and retired from the stage. Ward resumed her career in 1905 after her husband suffered severe business losses that left him, according to news reports, "practically penniless". In April 1907, she returned to the Broadway stage to perform in A Marriage of Reason at the Wallack's Theatre. She was then cast two years later in another Broadway production, The New Lady Bantock; and after its run at Wallack's, she and other cast members took the play on tour to various cities during the latter half of 1909. Yet another popular Broadway play in which she performed was the comedy Madam President, which was presented at the Garrick Theatre from September 1913 to January 1914.

Film

In 1915, around the time Ward's stage career was waning, American movie producer and director Cecil B. DeMille convinced her to perform in The Cheat, a silent film melodrama co-starring Japanese actor Sessue Hayakawa. The film proved to be a sensation due to its plot mingling of racial and sexual themes. In it Ward portrays a society woman who embezzles money and turns to an Asian ivory dealer (Hayakawa) for help, with brutal consequences. The movie launched the careers of DeMille and Hayakawa, who soon became Hollywood's first Asian star.

In addition to starring in The Hardest Way in 1921, Ward also appears in several shorts released in the 1920s: the Phonofilm short Father Time (1924) in which she sings; another Phonofilm production, The Perennial Flapper (1924); and in the Vitaphone short The Miracle Woman (1929).

In 1926, trading on her ever-youthful public image, Ward opened a Paris beauty shop, "The Fountain of Youth".

Personal life and death

Fannie Ward was married twice. Her first husband was Joseph Lewis, a British money lender and diamond dealer. They married in 1898. In 1909, in an interview with newspaper reporter Marguerite Martyn, Ward stated, "My husband hates my work", and then she questioned why women are treated differently than men professionally:

On January 14, 1913, less than four years after the noted interview, Ward and Lewis divorced. The following year she married her second husband, John Wooster Dean (born John H. Donovan, 1874–1950), an actor who had frequently co-starred with her on stage and in films. 

Ward's only child, Dorothé Mabel Lewis (1900–1938), was the result of an affair with the Viscount Castlereagh, who in 1915 became The Most Hon. The 7th Marquess of Londonderry (1878-1949), an Anglo-Irish aristocrat from Ulster. She married firstly, in 1917, RAF Captain Isaac Henry Woolf ("Jack") Barnato (1894-1918), son of the diamond and gold mining entrepreneur Barney Barnato and secondly to Terence Conyngham Plunket, 6th Baron Plunket, and had three sons. She and her husband were killed in a plane crash due to heavy fog.

On January 21, 1952, at age 79, Ward suffered a stroke in her Park Avenue apartment and was found unconscious by a neighbor. She remained in a coma until her death six days later at Lenox Hill Hospital. The New York Times reported that Ward died without a will and left an estate with an estimated value of $40,000. The newspaper also reported that she was survived by "three English grandsons": Lord Patrick Plunkett, the Hon. Shaun Plunkett, and the Hon. Robin Plunkett.

Filmography

 The Miracle Woman (1929) - Ward stars in a Vitaphone short film (survives)
 The Perennial Flapper (1924) - Ward performs comedy sketch as the "perennial flapper" in a DeForest Phonofilm short film
 Father Time (1924) in a Phonofilm short film
 La Rafale (1920)
 Le Secret du Lone Star (1920)
 Our Better Selves (1919) .... Loyette Merval (lost)
 The Profiteers (1919) .... Beverly Randall (lost)
 The Cry of the Weak (1919) .... Mary Dexter (lost)
 Common Clay (1919) .... Ellen Neal (lost)
 The Only Way (1919) (unknown status)
 The Narrow Path (1918) .... Marion Clark (lost)
 A Japanese Nightingale (1918) .... Yuki (survives)
 The Yellow Ticket (1918) .... Anna Mirrel (lost)
 Innocent (1918) .... Innocent (lost)
 On the Level (1917) .... Merlin Warner, aka Mexicali May (lost)
 The Crystal Gazer (1917) .... Rose Jorgensen/Rose Keith/Norma Dugan (lost)
 Her Strange Wedding (1917) .... Coralie Grayson (lost)
 Unconquered (1917) .... Mrs. Jackson (lost)
 A School for Husbands (1917) .... Lady Betty Manners (lost)
 The Winning of Sally Temple (1917) .... Sally Temple (survives)
 Betty to the Rescue (1917) (lost)
 The Years of the Locust (1916) .... Lorraine Roth (survives)
 Witchcraft (1916) .... Suzette (lost)
 Each Pearl a Tear (1916) .... Diane Winston, aka Each Hour a Pearl (USA: alternative title), Every Pearl a Tear (survives)
 A Gutter Magdalene (1916) .... Maida Carrington (lost)
 For the Defense (1916) .... Fidele Roget (survives)
 Tennessee's Pardner (1916) .... Tennessee (survives)
 The Cheat (1915) .... Edith Hardy (survives)
 The Marriage of Kitty (1915) .... Katherine "Kitty" Silverton (lost)

Gallery

References

External links

 Fannie Ward at Silents Are Golden
 
 Fannie Ward at Silent Ladies & Gents
 	Fannie Ward scrapbooks, 1875-1954, held by the Billy Rose Theatre Division, New York Public Library for the Performing Arts
 Fannie Ward her stage years portrait gallery at NY Public Library Billy Rose collection
Rare portrait of Fannie Ward

1872 births
1952 deaths
Vaudeville performers
19th-century American actresses
American stage actresses
American film actresses
American silent film actresses
Actresses from St. Louis
People from Manhattan
20th-century American actresses